Kaba Démé (Kaba ’Dem, Ta Sara, Sara Deme), or just Dem, is a Bongo–Bagirmi language of Chad and the Central African Republic. It is one of several local languages that go by the names Kaba and Sara.

References

Bongo–Bagirmi languages
Languages of Chad
Languages of the Central African Republic